The subdivisions of the Polish People's Republic changed several times from the Republic's inception in 1946 to the latest revision in 1999. The first subdivisions of the Republic involved the territories that were acquired in the west after World War II. They were subsequently reformed in 1946, 1950, 1957 and 1975. The 1975 division survived the fall of communism in 1990. The current administrative subdivisions were finalised in 1999. While they closely resemble the 1945–75 scheme, they have different names since the Communists tended to simply name the voivodeships after their capitals, whereas the current ones use more historical names. In some cases, there were border adjustments.

After World War II, Poland lost  of eastern regions (Kresy), gaining instead the smaller but much more industrialized so-called "Regained Territories" east of the Oder–Neisse line. This annexation of German territory was agreed by the Allied Powers at the Potsdam Conference in 1945.

The Polish People's Republic was divided into several voivodeships (the Polish unit of administrative division). After World War II, the new administrative divisions were based on the pre-war ones. The areas in the East that were not annexed by the Soviet Union had their borders left almost unchanged. Newly acquired territories in the west and north were organised into the voivodeships of Szczecin, Wrocław, Olsztyn and partially joined to Gdańsk, Katowice and Poznań voivodeships. Two cities were granted voivodeship status: Warsaw and Łódź.

In 1950 new voivodeships were created: Koszalin—previously part of Szczecin, Opole—previously part of Katowice, and Zielona Góra—previously part of Poznań, Wrocław and Szczecin voivodeships. In addition, three other cities were granted voivodeship status: Wrocław, Kraków and Poznań.

In 1973, Polish voivodeships were changed again. This reorganization of administrative division of Poland was mainly a result of local government reform acts of 1973 to 1975. A three-level administrative division (voivodeship, county, commune) was replaced with a two-level administrative division (49 small voivodeships and communes). The three smallest voivodeships: Warsaw, Kraków and Łódź had a special status of municipal voivodeship; the city president (mayor) was also province governor.

The system of division remained in effect after the fall of the People's Republic, until 1999, when a system of larger voivodeships and powiats was again introduced (see Administrative divisions of Poland).

Poland's voivodeships 1945–1975 (14+2 voivodeships, then 17+5) 

After World War II, the new administrative division of the country was based on the prewar one. The areas in the east that had not been annexed by the Soviet Union had their borders left almost unchanged. The newly acquired territories in the west and north were organized into the voivodeships of Szczecin, Wrocław and Olsztyn, and partly joined to Gdańsk, Katowice and Poznań voivodeships. Two cities were granted voivodeship status: Warsaw and Łódź.

In 1950, new voivodeships were created: Koszalin (previously part of Szczecin), Opole (previously part of Katowice), and Zielona Góra (previously part of Poznań, Wrocław and Szczecin voivodeships). In addition, three more cities were granted voivodeship status: Wrocław, Kraków and Poznań.

Poland's voivodeships 1975–1989 (49 voivodeships)

This reorganization of the administrative division of Poland was mainly a result of the local government reform acts of 1973–1975. In place of the three-level administrative division (voivodeship, county, commune), a new two-level administrative division was introduced (49 small voivodeships, and communes). The three smallest voivodeships—Warsaw, Kraków and Łódź—had the special status of municipal voivodeships; those cities' presidents (mayors) were also their provincial governors.

References 

Polish People's Republic
Former subdivisions of Poland